Bernard Waring was an English footballer who played for Southend United.

References

English footballers
English Football League players
Kiveton Park F.C. players
Southend United F.C. players
Year of birth missing
Year of death missing
Place of birth missing
Place of death missing
Worksop Town F.C. players
Association footballers not categorized by position